Ben Joyce may refer to:
 Ben Joyce (footballer)
 Ben Joyce (baseball)